The 1900 Chicago Orphans season was the 29th season of the Chicago Orphans franchise, the 25th in the National League and the 8th at West Side Park. The Orphans tied with the St. Louis Cardinals for fifth in the National League with a record of 65–75.

Regular season

Season standings

Record vs. opponents

Roster

Player stats

Batting

Starters by position 
Note: Pos = Position; G = Games played; AB = At bats; H = Hits; Avg. = Batting average; HR = Home runs; RBI = Runs batted in

Other batters 
Note: G = Games played; AB = At bats; H = Hits; Avg. = Batting average; HR = Home runs; RBI = Runs batted in

Pitching

Starting pitchers 
Note: G = Games pitched; IP = Innings pitched; W = Wins; L = Losses; ERA = Earned run average; SO = Strikeouts

Relief pitchers 
Note: G = Games pitched; W = Wins; L = Losses; SV = Saves; ERA = Earned run average; SO = Strikeouts

External links
1900 Chicago Orphans season at Baseball Reference

Chicago Cubs seasons
Chicago Orphans season
Chicago Cubs